Santiago Nicolás Carrera Sanguinetti (born March 5, 1994), known as Santiago Carrera, is an Uruguayan footballer who currently plays for Danubio.

Club career
On 2 September 2019, he signed with Italian club Bisceglie.

References

External links
 
 

1994 births
Footballers from Montevideo
Uruguayan people of Italian descent
Living people
Uruguayan footballers
Uruguayan expatriate footballers
Uruguay youth international footballers
Association football defenders
Club Atlético River Plate (Montevideo) players
Sud América players
Club Atlético Huracán footballers
Liverpool F.C. (Montevideo) players
Defensor Sporting players
A.S. Bisceglie Calcio 1913 players
Deportivo Maldonado players
Danubio F.C. players
Uruguayan Primera División players
Argentine Primera División players
Serie C players
Uruguayan expatriate sportspeople in Argentina
Uruguayan expatriate sportspeople in Italy
Expatriate footballers in Argentina
Expatriate footballers in Italy